The 1914 Texas Mines Miners football team was the first intercollegiate American football team to represent Texas School of Mines (now known as the University of Texas at El Paso). During the 1914 college football season, the team was coached by Tommy Dwyer, compiled a 2–3 record, and was outscored by a total of 64 to 34.

The first intercollegiate game was a 19–0 loss to New Mexico A&M. The series with New Mexico A&M evolved into a rivalry (now known as the Battle of I-10) that has been played almost 100 times.

Schedule

References

Texas Mines
UTEP Miners football seasons
Texas Mines Miners football